The 2000 Swedish Touring Car Championship season was the fifth Swedish Touring Car Championship (STCC) season. It was contested over eight rounds (comprising sixteen races) at six different circuits.

Norwegian Tommy Rustad won his first championship for the Crawford Nissan Racing team and became the first non-Swedish driver to win the championship.

Entry list

Race calendar and winners

Drivers' Championship

Synsam Cup for Privateers

References

External links
touring-cars.net

Swedish Touring Car Championship seasons
Swedish Touring Car Championship
Swedish Touring Car Championship season